Takikomi gohan (炊き込みご飯, 炊き込み御飯) is a Japanese rice dish seasoned with dashi and soy sauce along with mushrooms, vegetables, meat, or fish. The ingredients of takikomi gohan are cooked with the rice. This dish is consumed by people in Japan around the fall season since many root vegetables and mushrooms are harvested during this season in Japan. Ingredients will vary based on the seasonal vegetables and fish. Since this dish contains nutritional value, and uses a small amount of rice with vegetables and proteins, some Japanese people eat it for dieting purposes.

History 
 was created during the Nara period. Rice was scarce then, so people conserved rice by adding millet or other cereals, wild vegetables, yam or Japanese radish, creating an early form of  called . During the Muromachi period,  became popular, turned into a dish called  using ingredients such as barley, beans, and vegetables. Over time people became creative and made a variety of dishes with seasonal ingredients.

Difference from maze gohan 
 is prepared by adding the ingredients, broth and seasonings to raw rice and cook them together. In contrast,  is prepared by first cooking rice alone, then mixing the ingredients into it.

Variations
 Tai-meshi (鯛飯): Rice with whole sea bream.
 Ayu-meshi (鮎飯): Rice with whole sweetfish.
 Matsutake gohan (松茸御飯): Rice with matsutake mushrooms.
 Kani-meshi (蟹飯): Rice with crab.
  (or ): Combination of ingredients such as shiitake mushrooms, bamboo shoots, burdock root, carrots, konnyaku, chicken, or white-fleshed fish. In the Osaka dialect, this dish is called kayaku gohan (加薬御飯).
:  cooked and served in a single-serving pot.
: Rice with chestnuts.
: Okinawan cuisine of rice with pork.

See also
 Arroz con Pollo, Arroz con gandules, Platillo Moros y Cristianos, Gallo Pinto, Pabellón criollo, Rice and beans (Latin America)
 Biryani (South Asia)
 Fried Rice (East Asia)
 Jambalaya (Louisiana)
 Jollof rice (West Africa)
 Hoppin' John (Southern United States)
 Kabsa (Saudi Arabia)
 Kedgeree (United Kingdom)
 Kushari (Egypt)
 Nasi Goreng (Indonesia)
 Paella (Spain)
 Pilaf/Pulao (Greece, Balkans, Turkey, Iran, Central Asia, South Asia)
 Rice and peas (Caribbean)
 Risotto (Italy)
 Spanish rice (Mexico)

References

Japanese rice dishes